Žikava is a village and municipality in Zlaté Moravce District of the Nitra Region, in western-central Slovakia. In 2011 it had a population of 514 inhabitants.

History
In historical records the village was first mentioned in 1075 : Sikula or Sichoua, Sichoa (in 1209), Sitva (1293), Zikawa (1773), Žikawa (1808). The Hungarian name is Zsikva (Phonetics : Sykava).

The village belongs to John Both de Bajna in 1492. A branch of this family will take the name of this village : the Both, next Burchad, Bélavary de Sykava.

Geography
The municipality lies at an altitude of 281 metres and covers an area of 11.291 km². It has a population of 514 inhabitants.

References

External links
http://www.e-obce.sk/obec/zikava/zikava.html

Villages and municipalities in Zlaté Moravce District